Elian's Dublin was a private Spanish international school in Bray, County Wicklow, Ireland,  from the centre of Dublin. The Spanish government recognised it as a Centro Privado Español en el Extranjero, and it offered primary through bachillerato (high school) classes. A part of the IALE Elian's education group, it was located in Jubilee Hall, a castle in Bray.

References

External links

 Elian's Dublin

Education in Bray, County Wicklow
International schools in the Republic of Ireland
Schools in County Wicklow
Secondary schools in County Wicklow
Spanish international schools in Europe